Huadian Energy Company Limited is an electric power company based in Harbin, Heilongjiang province. The significant shareholder of the listed company is the state-owned China Huadian.

Huadian Energy Company Limited was one of the first joint-stock pilot projects of the Heilongjiang Province government with the former State Ministry of Power Industry. The company was formed 2 February 1993. In 1996 A shares and B shares were listed on the Shanghai Stock Exchange. The main businesses are power generation, heating, green energy and power equipment manufacturing.

As of the end of 2008 the company had 16.8 billion RMB total assets. Total installed capacity of  3.4 GW with 4.2 GW in construction. The company is also developing wind power projects and sludge incineration.

References

External links
 

Electric power companies of China
Companies listed on the Shanghai Stock Exchange
Companies based in Harbin